Thomas Crooks Ferguson (Born November 27, 1933 in Henderson, Kentucky; Died June 28, 2021 in Jacksonville, Florida) was a former United States Ambassador to Brunei and a former US Government Official. He served as Deputy Commissioner and Chief Operating Officer of the Immigration and Naturalization Service.

Early life and education
Thomas C. Ferguson was born November 27, 1933, in Henderson, Kentucky. Mr. Ferguson graduated from Vanderbilt University (B.A., 1955) and Vanderbilt Law School (J.D., 1959). He served in the United States Army in 1956.

Career
Mr. Ferguson began his career as an attorney with Woodson, Pattisall & Garner in Chicago, Illinois, 1959 - 1960. In August 1960, he served on the campaign staff of Senator John S. Cooper in Washington, DC, until November 1960. He then joined the law firm of Sandidge, Hollbrook & Craig in Owensboro, Kentucky, and was an attorney there until 1963. From 1963 to 1975, he was marketing manager, Pharmaseal Labs, Inc., in Glendale, CA. Mr. Ferguson then became owner and president of Brevard Marina, Inc., Marina & Shipyard in Melbourne, Florida, until 1977 - 1982, when he became owner and president of Atlantic Salvage Systems (underwater exploration) in Indialantic, Florida. In 1982 he joined the Government as Director for the Eastern Caribbean with the Peace Corps. In 2012, Mr. Ferguson joined GFIT Ventures as a Strategic Advisor specializing on Intel and International clients where he continues to work today.

Immigration and Naturalization Service

From 1984 to 1987 Mr. Ferguson was Deputy Commissioner and Chief Operating Officer of the United States Immigration and Naturalization Service in Washington, DC. There he maintained the full responsibility for the overall management and operation  of over 16,000 employees. As Deputy Commissioner Mr. Ferguson lead early calls for reform. His ideas would ultimately end up in the Immigration Act of 1990. Mr. Ferguson's main contributions to the Act were Border Security and the concept of Employment Based Visas, including the innovative EB-5 immigrant investor visa.

Ambassador to Brunei
On April 8, 1987 he was nominated to be the ambassador Ambassador of the United States to Brunei Darussalam. He would succeed Barrington King. There he was Chief of Mission responsible for all components of the U.S. Embassy 1987-1989 .
While serving as Ambassador, he promoted military sales and U.S. business in country and U.S. government interests in region.

Death
Ambassador Ferguson passed away on June 28, 2021 in Jacksonville, Florida. He was 87 years old.

References

1933 births
Living people
Ambassadors of the United States to Brunei
People from Henderson, Kentucky
American chief operating officers
Vanderbilt University alumni
Vanderbilt University Law School alumni